Jafta Mamabolo (born December 21, 1987), is a South African actor and filmmaker. He is best known for his roles in the popular films Freedom, Gangster's Paradise: Jerusalema and Otelo Burning.

Personal life
He was born in 1987 in Limpopo, South Africa. He attended the National School of Arts and studied drama under renowned artists. Meanwhile, he wanted to be a fashion designer and studied a course of designing.

Career
In 2008, he was selected for the film Jerusalema. The feature became his first film, where he played the character 'Young Kunene'. He received critical acclaim for the role. In 2011, he made lead appearance in the film Otelo Burning, directed by Sara Blecher. The film became a blockbuster and later received a total of 13 nominations in the African Movie Academy Awards (AMAA) in 2012 as well as in 2013 Africa Magic Viewers Choice Awards and 8th Africa Movie Academy Awards. In 2015, he acted in the film Ayanda with role of 'Lenaka'. In 2016, he became famous with the feature film Kalushi: The Story of Solomon Mahlangu, which was based on a true story. In the film, he played a supportive role of 'Lucky'. The film was a critical success and awarded at several film festivals.

Apart from cinema, he worked as a presenter on various television shows, such as the 'Molo show', 'Craze E', and 'Knock knock'. Then he joined the cast of third and fourth season of youth drama program Soul Buddyz which aired on SABC1. His role later received a nomination for the Best Lead Actor in a TV drama series. In 2011, he played the role 'Matthew' in the popular soapie Generations.

After two-year long hiatus, he made a comeback in 2018 with the film Freedom''. He wrote and directed the script for the film. The film later became a super hit in South African cinema.

Filmography

References

External links
 
 Chill, guys! There’s no 'beef' between Jafta Mamabolo and Masasa Mbangeni

Living people
South African male television actors
1983 births
South African male film actors
People from Limpopo